Jonatan Aron Leandoer Håstad (born 18 July 1996), known professionally as Yung Lean, is a Swedish rapper, singer and songwriter. Widely cited as one of the most influential figures in the early cloud rap era, Yung Lean rose to prominence in 2013 with his song "Ginseng Strip 2002", which went viral on YouTube. Later that same year, he released his debut mixtape, Unknown Death 2002, and the following year, he released his debut studio album, Unknown Memory. In 2016, Yung Lean released his second mixtape, Frost God, and his second studio album, Warlord. In 2017, he released his third studio album, Stranger, followed by his third mixtape, Poison Ivy, in 2018. Yung Lean's fourth studio album, Starz, was released in 2020. He then released his fourth mixtape, Stardust, in 2022.

Early life
Håstad was born on 18 July 1996 in Stockholm to Kristoffer Leandoer, a Swedish poet, fantasy author, and translator of French literature who owned a book publishing company and Elsa Håstad, a former human rights activist who worked with LGBT groups in Russia, Vietnam, and South America, since 2019 serving as the Swedish ambassador to Albania.

Håstad spent his early childhood in Minsk, Belarus, where his mother moved the family so Håstad could have a similar childhood to her. The family returned to Sweden and settled in Stockholm when Håstad was somewhere between the ages of three and five. He was raised in the city's Södermalm district. In between, Håstad was a student at UNIS Hanoi from 6th to 10th grade. During his time in high school, Håstad often got in trouble for doing drugs or writing graffiti. He also had a job at a local McDonald's. When he was 15, he was put on probation for smoking cannabis. Håstad began to develop an interest in hip hop music, mentioning 50 Cent's Get Rich or Die Tryin', The Latin Kings's Mitt Kvarter and Nas's Illmatic as his early influences.

Career

2012–2013: Career beginnings, Lavender and Unknown Death 2002

In 2012, Håstad met Yung Sherman and Gud in a local Stockholm park and they struck up a friendship, discovering they enjoyed much of the same music. Another group of Stockholm artists who would later form the group Drain Gang were also member of Hasch Boys.

When many of the other members of Hasch Boys began to lose interest in the group, Håstad, Sherman and Gud broke off and formed the group "Sad Boys" as a trio. By 2012, Yung Gud and Yung Sherman were producing and mixing music while Håstad had begun writing lyrics and recording vocals in a makeshift studio in his basement. They shared the music they made on the platforms SoundCloud and Tumblr, where Lean began to generate a large following. Sad Boys performed their first show in Gothenburg, Sweden on 5 May 2013.

Yung Lean became widely known when the music video for his track "Ginseng Strip 2002" went viral, exceeding 73 million views on YouTube as of September 2022. Later in 2013, he put out his first official releases: Unknown Death 2002 and an EP titled Lavender which includes the track "Ginseng Strip 2002" along with other songs that were cut from Unknown Death 2002. 
Consequence of Sound placed "Ginseng Strip 2002" at number 44 on their "Top 50 Songs of 2013",  while Vibe included Unknown Death 2002 in their list, "The 10 Most Overlooked Debut Rap Mixtapes of 2013", describing it as "a natural progression from the freely associative, often nonsensical rhymes of Lil' B with a keener sense of melody".

In 2013, Yung Lean and Sad Boys toured throughout Europe. Later that same year, Acclaim Magazine had Yung Lean as their guest for a Q&A "smalltalk" segment, where they asked him about a wide variety of miscellaneous things, including his favourite hangover cure and his desktop wallpaper.

2014–2016: Unknown Memory and Warlord

In 2014, Yung Lean and Sad Boys embarked on the White Marble Tour, playing in 24 cities across Europe. Shortly after the conclusion of this tour Sad Boys announced a further Black Marble Tour, which would include several performances in cities across North America. The first of these shows took place in July at the Webster Hall in New York City, and was well received by writers for publications such as XXL, and The New York Times.

Yung Lean starred on Studio PSL in May 2014 and was also one of five final nominees for the 2014 P3 Guld in the Hip Hop/Soul category.

Yung Lean released his debut full-length album, titled Unknown Memory on 23 September 2014.  The album was accompanied with North American and European tours, beginning on 1 December in New York with a nearly sold-out show on Webster Hall's main ballroom stage.

Yung Lean released his second full-length album, Warlord, on 25 February 2016; he also released a line of clothing, "Sad Boys Entertainment". Håstad modelled for Calvin Klein's July 2016, AW16 Campaign. During his Warlord American tour, his tour bus in Pennsylvania was shot at. Håstad was also featured on Frank Ocean's critically acclaimed Blonde where he provided backup vocals on the songs "Godspeed" and "Self Control". According to Håstad, his part on the project was recorded when he was seventeen in Ocean's apartment in London.

Yung Lean released a surprise track on 25 November 2016 titled "Hennessy & Sailor Moon (feat. Bladee)". On 14 December 2016 he released the mixtape Frost God containing eight tracks including "Hennessy & Sailor Moon" and "Crystal City" which featured A$AP Ferg.

2017–2019: Stranger, Poison Ivy and Nectar

Håstad released his third studio album Stranger on 10 November 2017, with the singles "Red Bottom Sky", "Hunting My Own Skin", and "Skimask", through Stockholm label YEAR0001.

In an interview with Complex in January 2018, Håstad announced he was writing several film scripts, including one based around Swedish serial killer John Ausonius, best known as "The Laser Man". In February 2018, Yung Lean released the single "King Cobra" with Thaiboy Digital, as well as a collaboration with Converse that consisted of a shoe and several items of clothing titled "One Star Toxic."

On 2 November 2018, Håstad released his third mixtape Poison Ivy with the single "Happy Feet" released on 24 October 2018. The album, a collaboration with Whitearmor, a member of Drain Gang with whom Håstad frequently collaborates, debuted at number 44 on the Sweden Albums Charts, the Sverigetopplistan.

On 25 January 2019, Yung Lean released his first full-length album under Jonatan Leandoer96 "Nectar", with the singles "Wooden Girl", "Nectar" and "Tangerine Warrior". The album strays away from Leandoer's sad hip-hop roots and goes for a blend of indie rock and neofolk.

2020–present: Starz, Blodhundar & Lullabies, In My Head, Stardust, and Sugar World
On 26 February 2020, Yung Lean released the single "Boylife in EU," produced by frequent collaborator Whitearmor. On 27 March 2020 Yung Lean uploaded a 44-second teaser featuring a mix of songs from his upcoming fourth-studio album "Starz". Owing to the global COVID-19 pandemic the Starz tour which was due to begin in late March was cancelled, and on 2 April 2020 Yung Lean streamed a 45-minute concert from the back of a truck in an undisclosed location, the stream featuring a mix of songs from previous works, as well as newly released "Boylife in EU." On 14 April 2020 the second single from Starz was released, "Violence + Pikachu." Starz was released on 15 May 2020, the album being produced by Whitearmor and Yung Sherman and featuring Ariel Pink on the album's title track.

On 9 November 2020, Yung Lean announced the release of his second full-length Jonatan Leandoer96 album, "Blodhundar & Lullabies". The 16-track album eventually released a month later on 21 December.

On 27 November 2020, the documentary Yung Lean: In My Head premiered in cinemas. Directed by music documentarian Henrik Burman, the documentary charts Leandoer's early career up until the release of Stranger. This includes reflections on the events that occurred in Miami from Leandoer, fellow artist Bladee and additional persons including manager Oskar Ekman, former associate Steven Machat and journalists from a variety of outlets including The Fader and Pitchfork. The documentary was originally scheduled to premiere at the 2020 Tribeca Film Festival, but was delayed due to the COVID-19 pandemic. It released digitally and in a limited number of cinemas in the fall of the same year instead.

On 8 April 2022, Yung Lean released a 12-track mixtape titled "Stardust" containing features from FKA twigs, Skrillex, Drain Gang and Ant Wan.

On 14 December 2022, the single "Blue Light" was released as Jonatan Leandoer96, accompanied by a music video directed by Olle Knutson and Philip Hovensjö. This announced his full-length album titled Sugar World, which was subsequently released on 3 February 2023.

Artistry
XXL included him in their 2014 list of "15 European Rappers You Should Know". Fact magazine viewed the Unknown Death 2002 mixtape as "a logical continuation of Clams Casino and Beautiful Lou's innovative techniques, emerging with thick, melancholy numbers that drip with a rare and earnest allure." In 2013, Fact published another article titled "Rise of the Sad Boys: from Kompakt to Yung Lean, a history of how electronic musicians have worn their sadness on their sleeves", which claimed that "[Yung Lean]'s mixtape Unknown Death 2002 is the epitome of sad rap".

Yung Lean was described by Entertainment Weekly as "loosely affiliated" with the cloud rap movement. According to music website HighClouds, part of Yung Lean's appeal is "the production provided by Yung Gud and Yung Sherman who combine the cloud rap of Clams Casino with electronic music touches".

Yung Lean is also the vocalist for the post-punk band Död Mark, along with fellow Sad Boys member Gud. The duo's debut album, Drabbad av Sjukdom was released in 2016 through Stockholm label YEAR0001.

Yung Lean credits SpaceGhostPurrp, Lil B, Three 6 Mafia, The Latin Kings, 50 Cent, The Fall, No Doubt, Young Thug, Chief Keef and Nas as influences.

Personal life 
Outside of music, Håstad is writing a screenplay about a "strange gangster drama" and a rock opera about John Ausonius, a Swedish serial killer. Håstad has aspirations to become an actor.

Håstad has several hobbies, including reading, ceramics, painting, writing and playing piano. Håstad began painting following his release from a mental health hospital as a way to relax.  In a 2019 interview, Håstad told Kaleidoscope magazine that he has bipolar disorder. He was diagnosed with it in 2017 and takes medication for his condition.

Hospitalization
While recording his second studio album Warlord, Håstad lived in Miami Beach, Florida, US. During this time, Håstad became addicted to Xanax, lean and cocaine. On 7 April 2015, Håstad overdosed and was hospitalized in Mount Sinai Medical Center & Miami Heart Institute. Håstad's overdose and subsequent hospitalization coincided with the death of his manager and close personal friend, Barron Machat. After the incident, Håstad moved back to Sweden to live with his family.

Recognition 
Håstad has been credited for being a pioneer in the emo rap, cloud rap, and soundcloud rap genres.
In 2019, Yung Lean was awarded the Bram Stoker Medal of Cultural Achievement by the University Philosophical Society at Trinity College, Dublin.

Discography 

Studio albums
 Unknown Memory (2014)
 Warlord (2016)
 Stranger (2017)
 Starz  (2020)

Mixtapes
 Unknown Death 2002 (2013)
 Frost God (2016)
 Poison Ivy (2018)
 Stardust (2022)

References

External links

1996 births
Hip hop record producers
Living people
Mumble rappers
Musicians from Stockholm
Singers from Stockholm
English-language singers from Sweden
Swedish expatriates in Belarus
Swedish people of Jewish descent
Swedish rappers
Swedish record producers
People with bipolar disorder